James Pasternak (born February 15, 1959) is a Canadian politician who represents Ward 6 York Centre on the Toronto City Council. Pasternak has served on council since he was elected in 2010, representing Ward 10 (later amalgamated into Ward 6). He was a Toronto District School Board trustee before his election to council.

Background 
Pasternak is a graduate of York University. He also has degrees from the University of Western Ontario and the London School of Economics and Political Science.

Political career 
Pasternak was elected to Toronto City Council in the 2010 city council election to succeed Mike Feldman in Ward 10. He was previously a Toronto District School Board trustee.

Israel apartheid debate
In 2012, Pasternak introduced a motion that asked City Manager Joe Pennachetti to update Toronto's anti-discrimination policy and to determine whether including QAIA in Pride events violated the policy. Pasternak believes "QuAIA is not there to support the Palestinian people; it’s there to bully and demonize Israel, its supporters and the Jewish community." The following year, in 2013, Pasternak continued to lead the effort to defund Toronto Pride over the use of the term Israel apartheid by its participating members.

Election results

References

External links

1959 births
Jewish Canadian politicians
Living people
Toronto District School Board trustees
Toronto city councillors
Alumni of the London School of Economics
University of Western Ontario alumni
York University alumni